The 8th Destroyer Flotilla, also styled as the Eighth Destroyer Flotilla, was a military formation of the British Royal Navy from 1911 to 1939.

History
The flotilla was established in August 1911. In 1912 was assigned to the Admiral of Patrols command  and was based at Chatham Dockyard. For the duration World War I it was on patrol duties. Post First World War it was transferred to the Mediterranean Fleet from 1921 to 1924. In 1925 it was reassigned to the China Station where it remained just before the Second World War in May 1939 when it was renamed 21st Destroyer Flotilla. It was first commanded by Commander Charles Wills and last commanded by Captain Harold Hickling.

Administration

Captains (D) afloat, 8th Destroyer Flotilla
Captain (D) afloat is a Royal Navy appointment of an operational commander of a destroyer flotilla or squadron.

References

Sources

External links

Destroyer flotillas of the Royal Navy
Military units and formations established in 1911
Military units and formations disestablished in 1939